"Lindbergh (The Eagle of the U.S.A.)" was a popular song written by famous Tin Pan Alley songwriters, Howard Johnson and Al Sherman in 1927.  It chronicles Charles Lindbergh's famous pioneer solo-flight across the Atlantic Ocean in the Spirit of St. Louis.  The song was an overnight hit being released immediately on the heels of Lindbergh's safe landing.

Recordings
Victor Records # 20674, side A, Vernon Dalhart, singer.
Oriole Records (U.S.) # 922, side A, Harry Crane, singer.
Edison Blue Amberol Cylinder # 5362, Vernon Dalhart, singer.

Literary sources
 

1927 songs
1927 singles
Cultural depictions of Charles Lindbergh
Songs written by Al Sherman
Songs with lyrics by Howard Johnson (lyricist)
Songs about aviators
Songs based on American history
Songs about explorers